The discography of British rock and pop band the Hollies consists of 21 studio albums, 24 compilation albums, two tribute/covers albums, seven extended plays, and 67 singles.

Since the Hollies released their first single on 17 May 1963, the group has had 30 charting singles on the UK Singles Chart, 21 on the Billboard Hot 100, 21 on RPM magazine's singles chart, 25 on Germany's singles chart, and 11 on the VG-lista singles chart. Many of the Hollies' singles contain three-part vocal harmony, although a few—such as "Long Cool Woman in a Black Dress"—do not contain any vocal harmonies.

A total of 15 albums by the Hollies have charted on the UK Albums Chart, 13 have charted on the Billboard 200, five have charted on the VG-lista albums chart, four have charted in the Netherlands, and six have charted on RPM magazine's Top Albums chart.

Albums

Compilation albums

Singles

EPs

Notes

A.Originally peaked at no.3 on first release in 1969 but subsequently reached no.1 when reissued in 1988.

References

External links
http://www.capitol6000.com/
 

Discographies of British artists
Rock music group discographies
Discography